Bernard Nii Aryee (born 23 April 1973) is a football player from Ghana, who was a member of the Men's National Team that won the bronze medal at the 1992 Summer Olympics in Barcelona, Spain.

Career
Bernard's previous clubs have been: Accra Great Olympics, Ghana (1989–1990); Accra Hearts of Oak, Ghana (1991–1994); AZ Alkmaar, Holland (1995–1996); FC Zwolle, Holland (1996–1997); FC Marine Castle, Singapore (1997–1998) and Liberty Professionals F.C., Ghana (1998–2000).

Titles
Career Championship winning records include: National League Champions, Ghana (1991 and 1992); National FA Champions, Ghana (1993); Olympic Games, Barcelona, Spain (bronze medal, 1992); Pre-Olympics Tournament, Cairo, Egypt (gold medalists-1992).

Coaching career
During his playing Career with the Liberty Professionals F.C., Bernard was also assigned with the responsibility of coaching their Youth Team. He held that position with distinction, and a winning record for five years.

International
Bernard has been a member of the Ghanaian National Teams that participated in Tournaments such as: World Youth Cup (Scotland 1989), Pre-Olympic tourney (Egypt 1992), Olympic Games qualifiers (1991–1992), African Championships Club Competition (1991–1993), African Cup Winners Cup Competition (1994).

Personal
Bernard Aryee resides in the US, and holds soccer coaching clinics for kids in and around the Maryland, Virginia, New Jersey, and DC Metro areas, and also the head coach of the Washington DC black meteors soccer team, based in Silver Spring, Maryland.

References

External links
 
 
 

1973 births
Living people
Ghanaian footballers
Ghana international footballers
Footballers at the 1992 Summer Olympics
Olympic footballers of Ghana
Olympic bronze medalists for Ghana
Olympic medalists in football
Medalists at the 1992 Summer Olympics
Accra Hearts of Oak S.C. players
AZ Alkmaar players
PEC Zwolle players
Ghanaian expatriate footballers
Expatriate footballers in the Netherlands
Association football midfielders